West Fifteenth Street Historic District may refer to:

West Fifteenth Street Historic District (Anniston, Alabama), listed on the National Register of Historic Places in Calhoun County, Alabama
West Fifteenth Street Historic District (Covington, Kentucky), listed on the National Register of Historic Places in Kenton County, Kentucky